Kärsämäki Airfield is an airfield in Kärsämäki, Finland.

See also
List of airports in Finland

References

External links
 VFR Suomi/Finland – Kärsämäki Airfield
 Lentopaikat.net – Kärsämäki Airfield 

Airports in Finland